Seavus Project Viewer is a viewer for Microsoft Project files. It reads the native .mpp  file format created in any Microsoft Project versions. As a project management software, it is designed to assist users (team members, team leads, project stakeholder and other project participant) to review their project assignments, print the project information and follow the overall project status. The application software shows critical path schedules and critical chain which are visualized in a Gantt chart.

Overview 

When the project manager saves the project in an .mpp file, which is the native file format for Microsoft Project, the formatting information is stored along with the project information in the same file. Seavus Project Viewer reads this information when opening .mpp files, showing the same formatting and visual styles as in Microsoft Project.

The supported versions of the .mpp file format are Microsoft Project 2003,  Microsoft Project 2007,  Microsoft Project 2010,  Microsoft Project 2013, and Microsoft Project 2016, Microsoft Project 2021.

Users can open Microsoft Project files hosted on the following cloud storages:
 Microsoft SharePoint 
 Microsoft Project Server
 OneDrive

Seavus Project Viewer is available for Microsoft Windows, Mac OS X,  via the web with an online version, on the mobile iOS, Windows Phone and Android platforms and as well with applications for the Apple Watch.

Features 
Seavus Project Viewer is a viewer for Microsoft Project files that provides a collaborative environment for project teams, without server installation. With the Task update functionality, teams can introduce a collaborative project environment, while the project manager will have up-to-date information about the current status of the project tasks and be able to track if all assignments in the project plan are finished on time.

Visual reports and dashboards or graphical reports allow team leads and project participants to view the health of the project plan. Users can view the status of the whole project, the work completion status, resources allocation status, and project and resources costs overview. The graphical reports can be customized according to the users′ preference, and monitor how a certain parameter changes throughout the lifespan of the project.

Seavus Project Viewer is fully integrated with most cloud storage providers. This allow users to open, view, and print Project Plans and Master Project Plans on a shared location, and every member to have access to the updated Microsoft Project plan. The complete SharePoint Integration enables users to manage all project plans directly from SharePoint hosted in-house, or to collaborate with team members using the Microsoft SharePoint in the cloud (SharePoint Online) included in Office 365 suite as well as OneDrive.

Seavus Project Viewer is fully integrated with Skype for Business to create a central application for meetings.

See also 
 List of project management software
 Microsoft Project

References

External links

Project management software
Windows software
Classic Mac OS software
IOS software